R v G [2003] is an English criminal law ruling on reckless damage, for which various offences it held that the prosecution must show a defendant subjectively appreciated a particular risk existing or going to exist to the health or property of another, and the damaging consequence, but carried on in the circumstances known to him unreasonably (to this latter stage of thought an objective test continues to apply) taking the risk. It abolished the "objective recklessness" test set out in R v Caldwell.

Facts
Two boys, aged 11 and 12 years, were camping without their parents' permission when they entered the back yard of a shophouse, the Co-op, of Newport Pagnell in the early hours of the morning. Lighting some newspapers they found there, they left, with the papers still burning. The newspapers set fire to nearby rubbish bins against the wall, where fire spread up and on to the roof. Approximately £1m damage was caused.  The children and their defence team argued they expected the fire to burn itself out although they were aware of the risk of fire spreading.

Judgment
The Court of Appeal acknowledged that the Caldwell test had been criticised and had not been applied in a number of Commonwealth jurisdictions and saw great force in these criticisms but held that it was not open to it to depart from it.

That Court agreed to refer upwards to the Judicial Committee of the House of Lords (the highest court) where Lord Bingham, giving the leading opinion of the unanimous five-judge decision, saw the need to modify (in Caldwell) Lord Diplock's definition to take account of the defence of infancy, which contains the concept of "mischievous discretion". This rule requires the court to consider the extent to which children of eight or more years are able to understand the difference between "right" and "wrong". The Diplock test of obviousness might operate unfairly for 11- and 12-year-old boys if they were held to the same standard as reasonable adults. Bingham stated that

This brings the test back to a subjective standard so that defendants can be judged on the basis of their age, experience and understanding rather than on the standard of a hypothetical reasonable person who might have better knowledge and understanding.

Application
In Booth v Crown Prosecution Service (2006) All ER (D) 225 (Jan), the Divisional Court upheld the defendant pedestrian's conviction of an offence of Criminal Damage that, by rashly dashing into the road, he recklessly damaged the vehicle that hit him.

British criminal law senior academics have written, in publications reviewed by an independent editorial team, this result must be correct if a pedestrian does actually consider the possibility of damage to any vehicle that might become involved in an accident, but it seems more likely that, if the defendant was aware of the risk of going into a road without looking, the overwhelming result learnt through experience or a repeated teaching would be the risk of self-injury. On analysing the rule in R v G the second limb would not seem to apply without imputing to people walking into the road a new teaching, which may require extrinsic evidence – such as an active campaign against jaywalking in a district or region.

Later legal change tabled as to eleven-year olds
The Age of Criminal Responsibility Bill is before Parliament to raise (if they pass it, so becoming an Act) the age of criminal responsibility to 12. To secure justice for severe crime victims it makes an order that may involve a care home or social workers under the Children Act 2004 or other, proportionate, child welfare intervention and/or civil liability (damages payable by parents), and an education system response, the main redress to crime to those under that age who commit violent, life-threatening or costly wrongs – almost all of which are crimes likely facing prosecution if carried out by anyone older.

Notes and citations
Notes

Citations

External links
 Full text

2003 in case law
2003 in England
G
Recklessness (law)
2003 in British law
House of Lords cases